The Batman of Earth-Two is an alternate version of the fictional superhero Batman, who appears in American comic books published by DC Comics. The character was introduced after DC Comics created Earth-Two, a parallel world that was retroactively established as the home of characters whose adventures had been published in the Golden Age of comic books. This provided justification within the fictional world of Batman stories for DC Comics publishing Batman comic books that disregarded the character's Golden Age stories, as Batman had been presented as a single ongoing incarnation of the character since his earliest stories were published.

Publication history
Batman of Earth-Two first appeared in Justice League of America #82 and was created by Dennis O'Neil and Dick Dillin.

The character history of the Earth-Two Batman accordingly adopts all of the earliest stories featuring the character from the 1930s and 1940s, while the adventures of the then-mainstream Silver Age Batman (who lived on "Earth-One") begin later in time and with certain elements of his origin retold. Each were depicted as separate, though parallel, individuals living in their respective universes, with the "older" Earth-Two character eventually reaching his retirement and death.

A parallel to this character is introduced in Justice Society of America (vol. 2) Annual #1 (2008) entitled "Earth-2" where the Post Crisis Earth-2 is fully introduced. The most notable difference between Pre-Crisis Earth-Two Wayne and his newer Post-Crisis Earth-2 incarnation is that the Post-Crisis Earth-2 Joker learned the real identities of Robin and the Huntress after turning Gotham DA Harvey Simms into the new Two-Face (Harvey knowing Helena's identity already).

A new parallel to this character was introduced in the 2012 Earth-2 series who died in the first issue, protecting that world from Darkseid's forces, alongside that world's Superman and Wonder Woman. His father, Thomas Wayne, later took up the mantle to atone for earlier sins, including deceiving his son about his own death. Dick Grayson would also take up the mantle during Earth 2: Earth's End and Earth 2: Society. Helena would later don the mantle after Dick retired at the end of the Society series.

Fictional character biography

Childhood and early history

Batman's origin and history is essentially similar to the Earth-One version of the character, but events unfold in more of a real-time fashion. For example, the Batman makes his debut in 1939, meets Robin, Joker, Catwoman, and Clayface at various points in 1940, Penguin in 1941, Two-Face in 1942, etc. These dates reflect the publishing dates of the original stories, rather than taking the Earth-One and Modern Age approach of keeping the characters eternally youthful.

 Bruce Wayne was born in Gotham City on May 18, 1915.
 Bruce's parents, Thomas and Martha Wayne, were killed when he was eight years old by a robber named Joe Chill, in 1923. According to a later retcon, Martha died from a heart attack reaction soon after Thomas was shot to death.
 Like his Earth-One counterpart, the Earth-Two Wayne is raised by his father's brother, Phillip Wayne, though he never recovers from his parents' murder and vows to one day wage a war against the criminal underworld in Gotham City. This aspect of the Batman mythos was retconned in the Post-Crisis history established by Frank Miller's Batman: Year One, where Phillip is eliminated and Alfred largely raises Bruce. In the Golden Age and Earth-Two reality, Wayne and Alfred meet for the first time in 1943, after Batman has already met Robin (and in fact, this version of Alfred is Alfred Beagle - his originally published name which was kept for the Earth-Two distinction).
 After a period of training, a young Bruce Wayne becomes Batman. His first printed story is "The Case of the Chemical Syndicate", although story content implies that this was not his first mission.
 Bruce Wayne meets eight-year-old Dick Grayson, following the murder of his parents by Boss Zucco who he overheard. Grayson eventually takes the identity of Robin and helps Batman apprehend Zucco.
 Batman meets Superman for the first time in the inaugural case of the Justice Society of America; the two heroes both become honorary members of the society and soon become lifelong friends, learning each other's secret identities. Unlike their Post-Crisis incarnations, they get along right away and often team up over the years. Along with Kal-L, Batman participates in the Justice Society and the war-time only All-Star Squadron.
 Batman dies in 1979.

Divergence with Earth-One
At the dawn of the Silver Age of comics, DC Comics decided to reintroduce several of their Golden Age superheroes, all of whom had ceased publication several years earlier. Flash and Green Lantern were reimagined as Barry Allen and Hal Jordan. Superman, Wonder Woman and Batman, having been continuously published since their Golden Age introductions, were not given any reimaginings (although much about the mythos of each had evolved slowly over the years). It was later revealed that the current heroes live on a parallel world to the Golden Age heroes: The newer Silver Age heroes are on "Earth-One", while the older Golden Age characters reside on "Earth-Two" (the numbering does not indicate any hierarchy of parallel Earths, only the number by which they were discovered). When Barry Allen met Jay Garrick, it meant there were two Flashes, two Green Lanterns, two Supermen, and two Batmen. Unlike the Silver Age versions of the Flash and Green Lantern, who had entirely different secret identities from their Golden Age counterparts Jay Garrick and Alan Scott, the Batman and Superman of each world were both Bruce Wayne and Clark Kent, respectively. There is no clear demarcation between when the stories of one Batman ends and the other begins. Indeed, many stories from the 1940s and the 1950s were treated as canon to both incarnations of Batman after the concept of Earth-One and Earth-Two was established; Some stories from the mid-1950s could have only occurred on Earth-One, while some stories as late as the early-1960s seem as though they could have also occurred on Earth-Two. DC has mandated that only the Earth-One Batman wore a yellow oval around the bat symbol on his chest, making 1964 the fixed year in which all Batman stories were set on Earth-One, although there are several instances where this is contradicted in-story.

The Earth-Two Wayne made several different character evolutions from the mainstream Batman, as the Earth-Two Bruce accepts his one-time adversary Catwoman as his true love and shares his secret identity with her after her memory is restored of her real life. The Earth-Two Wayne and Catwoman later marry, after she had voluntarily served prison time for her crimes. They have a daughter, Helena Wayne (also known as the Huntress), and the family resides at Wayne Manor where Bruce devotes himself and his fortune to philanthropy. By the early 1960s, Wayne has retired as Batman with Robin taking over crimefighting in Gotham City. He even accepted Wayne's position in the reformed Justice Society.

Wayne is later called out of retirement by the ancient god, Mercury to help defeat King Kull along with other superheroes of Pre-Crisis Earth-Two, Earth-One and Earth-S. He and Robin not only fought Joker on Earth-S, but also fought Weeper II of Earth-S, Doctor Light of Earth-One, and Shade of Earth-One

Several years after, that he again dons his costume to answer the Batsignal when Robin is away from Gotham City, but this adventure ends in tragedy as Batman's kick causes the criminal Cernak to fire his gun wildly, striking and killing Selina Wayne. Bruce burned his cape and cowl that night, swearing to never wear it again. Helena Wayne would become Huntress and bring Cernak to justice.

Bruces years of civic volunteerism results in him being named to replace the retiring James Gordon as Police Commissioner. In this capacity, Wayne is soon mind-controlled by the Psycho Pirate. Resulting in his declaring the current roster of the Justice Society of America to be outlaws and he attempts to arrest them. Once freed from the Psycho Pirate's control, Wayne clears the JSA of all trumped-up charges.

The elder Earth-Two Wayne is eventually coaxed out of retirement for one last mission as Batman when a thief named Bill Jensen is magically empowered by a sorcerer named Frederick Vaux (possibly the Earth-Two analogue to Felix Faust) and attacks Gotham City. As when he was eight, Earth-Two Wayne faces an overpowering criminal with a weapon that is greater than himself, though this time it is magical bolts rather than bullets. Already dying of cancer from his years of pipe smoking (as stated in The Brave and the Bold #197), Wayne decides to fight to the death against Jensen, who bears a furious grudge against Wayne, stopping his threat at the cost of his own life. In the aftermath of the battle, the public learns that Wayne was Batman's secret identity. The Earth-Two Doctor Fate later removes the memory of the battle from the consciousness of the general public, so as to protect the secret identities of Robin and the Huntress, which were also thus exposed, and causing everyone to believe instead that Wayne died of cancer at home on the same day that Batman died.

Several years after Bruce Wayne's death, Batman's diary was discovered and made public (as described in the limited series America vs. the Justice Society). In it, he charged the JSA with treason, being spies for Hitler, resulting in the team being put on trial. It is ultimately revealed that this was a hoax on Batman's part, designed to set a trap for a longtime Justice Society foe, Per Degaton. Knowing he was dying and would not be alive to combat Degaton's as yet unrevealed scheme, Wayne fabricated the treason charges so as to bring about a reexamination of the JSA's history, giving them clues as how to defeat the time traveling villain. It would prove to be the Earth Two Batman's final case, solved from the grave. Professor Zee, the scientist who had invented the Time Machine (and someone Per Degaton shot), appeared from it, which he had used to transport himself 40 years into the future, and accused Per Degaton of murder. Per Degaton then shot himself in the head.

As a tribute to this version of the character, his final formal 'appearance' was in Secret Origins (vol. 2) #6 (September 1986) in the story "Secret Origins Starring the Golden Age Batman" by writer Roy Thomas and artists Marshall Rogers and Terry Austin, a retelling of the Earth-Two Batman's origin.

In the limited series Crisis on Infinite Earths, the Anti-Monitor destroys most universes, reducing the universe to the anti-matter universe and a single positive matter universe. Earth-Two "never existed" in this new universe's history, which retroactively removes the Earth-Two Batman from history, blending elements of his past with that of the Earth-One Batman's, effectively creating a Batman with a new fictional history.

One Year Later
During Infinite Crisis, senior members of the Justice Society regain some memories of Earth-Two's previous existence. One year later when the Gentleman Ghost attacks the JSA using powers of limited control over the spirits of the dead, Jakeem Thunder and Johnny Thunderbolt are assisted in battle by the spirits of various deceased JSA members and allies, including the Batman of Earth-Two. Although Jakeem is confused by his presence noting that Batman is not dead, Johnny Thunderbolt tells him not to worry about it.

The New 52
In September 2011, DC Comics carried out a line-wide revision to its superhero comic book series and the fictional histories of their characters, branded as "The New 52". While Bruce Wayne was the first Batman, the second Earth-2 Batman is Thomas Wayne. Wayne is a corrupt doctor who works for the Mafia in Gotham City until he fakes his own death, deceiving his son about whether he has survived. The original Batman (Bruce Wayne) discovers his father's actions and disassociates himself with Thomas. Following Bruce Wayne's death where he sacrificed his life to fight off the invading forces from Apokolips, Thomas Wayne becomes the second Batman. As Batman, Thomas Wayne uses Hourman's Miraclo pills.

After Thomas Wayne sacrifices his life to prevent villains from a parallel world from entering his own, Dick Grayson becomes the third Batman.

Powers and abilities
The powers and abilities of the Earth-Two Batman are similar to his Earth-One counterpart. Like his Robin, Batman had his aging rate reduced after the JSA's fight with Ian Karkull.

Unlike his Earth-One counterpart, the Earth-Two Batman was shown to carry a gun after meeting Robin. He used a gun during his early adventures.

In other media
 The first live-action adaptations of Batman, in both the 1941 serial The Batman (portrayed by Lewis Wilson), and the 1966-68 TV series Batman and it's  film adaptation (played by Adam West), were visually based on both the Golden Age and Silver Age depictions, with Wilson's version evoking the colder and grimmer Golden Age era and West's version famously resembling the friendlier and campier Silver Age era. 
 The 2008-2013 animated series Batman: The Brave and the Bold, partially based on the comic book of the same name, while visually inspired by the Silver and Bronze Age depictions, also drew aspects from the Modern Age/Post-Crisis eras of the DC Universe, with Batman, while wearing a suit evoking his Silver Age appearance, has the sterner and far more serious demeanor of his modern depictions.
 Two Earth-Two Batman skins are available as downloadable content for the video game Batman: Arkham Origins. One is based on the New 52 Earth-Two Bruce Wayne and the other the New 52 Earth-Two Thomas Wayne. The latter skin is also available as downloadable content for Batman: Arkham Knight.

See also
 All-Star Squadron
 America vs. The Justice Society — A miniseries in which Batman (through his diary, discovered post-mortem) accuses the JSA of committing treason during World War II
 Batman
 Golden Age Robin
 Golden Age Catwoman
 Huntress (Helena Wayne)
 Multiverse (DC Comics)
 Superman of Earth-Two
 Wonder Woman of Earth-Two

Notes

References

External links
 Mike's Amazing World of DC Comics: Earth-Two Batman Index
 The Golden Age Batman Chronology
 JSA Fact File: Batman

Alternative versions of Batman
Characters created by Dick Dillin
Characters created by Dennis O'Neil
Comics characters introduced in 1939
Comics characters introduced in 1970
DC Comics male superheroes
DC Comics martial artists
Earth-Two
Fictional blade and dart throwers
Fictional characters from parallel universes
Fictional characters with cancer
Fictional detectives
Fictional escapologists
Fictional police commissioners
Vigilante characters in comics